Acrocercops unipuncta is a moth of the family Gracillariidae. It is known from Rennell Island.

References

unipuncta
Moths described in 1957
Moths of Oceania